Frances Perkins (born Fannie Coralie Perkins; April 10, 1880 – May 14, 1965) was an American workers-rights advocate who served as the 4th United States Secretary of Labor from 1933 to 1945, the longest serving in that position. A member of the Democratic Party, Perkins was the first woman ever to serve in a presidential cabinet.  As a loyal supporter of her longtime friend, President Franklin D. Roosevelt, she helped make labor issues important in the emerging New Deal coalition. She was one of two Roosevelt cabinet members to remain in office for his entire presidency (the other being Interior Secretary Harold L. Ickes).

Her most important role came in developing a policy for social security in 1935. She also helped form government policy for working with labor unions, although the union leaders distrusted her. Her Labor Department helped to mediate strikes by way of the United States Conciliation Service. Perkins dealt with many labor questions during World War II, when skilled labor was vital to the economy and women were moving into jobs formerly held by men.

Early life
Fannie Coralie Perkins was born in Boston, Massachusetts, to Susan Ella Perkins (née Bean; 1849–1927) and Frederick William Perkins (1844–1916), the owner of a stationer's business (both of her parents originally were from Maine). Fannie Perkins had one sister, Ethel Perkins Harrington (1884–1965). The family could trace their roots to colonial America, and the women had a tradition of work in education. She spent much of her childhood in Worcester, Massachusetts. Frederick loved Greek literature and passed that love on to Fannie.

Perkins attended the Classical High School in Worcester. She earned a bachelor's degree in chemistry and physics from Mount Holyoke College in 1902. While attending Mount Holyoke, Perkins discovered progressive politics and the suffrage movement. She was named class president. One of her professors was Annah May Soule, who assigned students to tour a factory to study working conditions; Perkins recalled Soule's course as an important influence.

Early career and continuing education
After college, Perkins held a variety of teaching positions, including one from 1904 to 1906 where she taught chemistry at Ferry Hall School (now Lake Forest Academy), an all-girls school in Lake Forest, Illinois. In Chicago, she volunteered at settlement houses, including Hull House, where she worked with Jane Addams. She changed her name from Fannie to Frances when she joined the Episcopal church in 1905. In 1907, she moved to Philadelphia and enrolled at University of Pennsylvania's Wharton School to learn economics and spent two years in the city working as a social worker. Shortly after, she moved to Greenwich Village, New York, where she attended Columbia University and became active in the suffrage movement. In support of the movement, Perkins attended protests and meetings, and advocated for the cause on street corners. She earned a master's degree in economics and sociology from Columbia in 1910.

In 1910 Perkins achieved statewide prominence as head of the New York office of the National Consumers League and lobbied with vigor for better working hours and conditions. She also taught as a professor of sociology at Adelphi College. The next year, she witnessed the tragic Triangle Shirtwaist Factory fire, a pivotal event in her life. The factory employed hundreds of workers, mostly young women, but lacked fire escapes. When the building caught fire, many workers tried unsuccessfully to escape through the windows. Just a year before, these same women and girls had fought for and won the 54-hour work week and other benefits that Perkins had championed. One hundred and forty-six workers died. Perkins blamed lax legislation for the loss.

As a consequence of this fire, Perkins left her position at the New York office of the National Consumers League and, on the recommendation of Theodore Roosevelt, became the executive secretary for the Committee on Safety of the City of New York, formed to improve fire safety. As part of the Committee on Safety, Perkins investigated another significant fire at the Freeman plant in Binghamton, New York, in which 63 people died. In 1913, she was instrumental in getting the New York legislature to pass a "54-hour" bill that capped the number of hours women and children could work. Perkins pressed for votes for the legislation, encouraging proponents including Franklin D. Roosevelt to filibuster, while Perkins called state senators to make sure they could be present for the final vote.

Marriage and personal life 
In 1913, Perkins married New York economist Paul Caldwell Wilson. She kept her maiden name because she did not want her activities in Albany and New York City to affect the career of her husband, then the secretary to the New York City mayor. She defended her right to keep her maiden name in court. The couple had a daughter, Susanna, born in December 1916. Less than two years later, Wilson began to show signs of mental illness. He would be institutionalized frequently for mental illness throughout the remainder of their marriage. Perkins had cut back slightly on her public life following the birth of her daughter, but returned after her husband's illness to provide for her family. According to biographer Kirstin Downey, Susanna displayed "manic-depressive symptoms", as well. Perkins maintained a long-standing romantic relationship with Mary Harriman Rumsey, who had founded the Junior League in 1901. The women lived together in Washington, DC until Rumsey’s death in 1934, after which Perkins shared her home with Caroline O’Day, a Democratic congresswoman from New York.

Return to work in New York 
Prior to moving to Washington, D.C., Perkins held various positions in the New York state government. She had gained respect from the political leaders in the state. In 1919, she was added to the Industrial Commission of the State of New York by Governor Al Smith. Her nomination was met with protests from both manufacturers and labor, neither of whom felt Perkins represented their interests. Smith stood by Perkins as someone who could be a voice for women and girls in the workforce and for her work on the Wagner Factory Investigating Committee. Although claiming the delay in Perkins's confirmation was not due to her gender, some state senators pointed to Perkins's not taking her husband's name as a sign that she was a radical. Perkins was confirmed on February 18, 1919, becoming one of the first female commissioners in New York, and began working out of New York City. The state senate-confirmed position made Perkins one of three commissioners overseeing the industrial code, and the supervisor of both the bureau of information and statistics and the bureau of mediation and arbitration. The position also came with an $8,000 salary, making Perkins the highest-paid woman in New York state government. Six months into her job, her fellow Commissioner James M. Lynch called Perkins’s contributions "invaluable," and added "[f]rom the work which Miss Perkins has accomplished I am convinced that more women ought to be placed in high positions throughout the state departments."

In 1929, the newly elected New York governor, Franklin Roosevelt, appointed Perkins as the inaugural New York state industrial commissioner. As commissioner, Perkins supervised an agency with 1,800 employees.

Having earned the co-operation and the respect of various political factions, Perkins helped put New York in the forefront of progressive reform. She expanded factory investigations, reduced the workweek for women to 48 hours, and championed minimum wage and unemployment insurance laws. She worked vigorously to put an end to child labor and to provide safety for women workers.

Cabinet career

In 1933, Roosevelt summoned Perkins to ask her to join his cabinet. Perkins presented Roosevelt with a long list of labor programs for which she would fight, from Social Security to minimum wage. "Nothing like this has ever been done in the United States before," she told Roosevelt. "You know that, don’t you?" Agreeing to back her, Roosevelt nominated Perkins as Secretary of Labor. The nomination was met with support from the National League of Women Voters and the Women's Party. The American Federation of Labor criticized the selection of Perkins because of a perceived lack of ties to labor.

As secretary, Perkins oversaw the Department of Labor. Perkins went on to hold the position for 12 years, longer than any other Secretary of Labor. She also became the first woman to hold a cabinet position in the United States, thus she became the first woman to enter the presidential line of succession. The selection of a woman to the cabinet had been rumored in the four previous administrations, with Roosevelt being the first to follow through. Roosevelt had witnessed Perkins’s work firsthand during their time in Albany. With few exceptions, President Roosevelt consistently supported the goals and programs of Secretary Perkins.

As Secretary of Labor, Perkins played a role in the New Deal by helping to write legislation. As chair of the President's Committee on Economic Security, she was involved in all aspects of its advisory reports, including the Civilian Conservation Corps and the She-She-She Camps. Her most important contribution was to help design the Social Security Act of 1935.

As Secretary of Labor, Perkins created the Immigration and Naturalization Service. She sought to implement liberal immigration policies but some of her efforts experienced pushback, especially in Congress.

As Secretary of Labor in the Roosevelt Administration, Frances Perkins went to Geneva between June 11 and 18, 1938. On June 13, she gave a speech at the International Labour Organization in which she called on the organization to make its contribution to the world economic recovery, while avoiding being dragged into political problems. She also defended the participation of the United States in the ILO, which it had joined in 1934  .

In 1939, she came under fire from some members of Congress for refusing to deport the communist head of the West Coast International Longshore and Warehouse Union, Harry Bridges. Ultimately, Bridges was vindicated by the Supreme Court.

With the death of President Roosevelt, Harry Truman replaced the Roosevelt cabinet, naming Lewis B. Schwellenbach as Secretary of Labor. Perkins's tenure as secretary ended on June 30, 1945, with the swearing in of Schwellenbach.

Later life
Following her tenure as Secretary of Labor, in 1945, Perkins was asked by President Truman to serve on the United States Civil Service Commission, which she accepted. In her post as commissioner, Perkins spoke out against government officials requiring secretaries and stenographers to be physically attractive, blaming the practice for the shortage of secretaries and stenographers in the government. Perkins left the Civil Service Commission in 1952 when her husband died. During this period, she also published a memoir of her time in the Roosevelt administration entitled, The Roosevelt I Knew (1946), which covered her personal history with Franklin Roosevelt, starting from their meeting in 1910.

Following her government service career, Perkins remained active and returned to educational positions at colleges and universities. She was a teacher and lecturer at the New York State School of Industrial and Labor Relations at Cornell University until her death in 1965, at age 85. She also gave guest lectures at other universities, including two 15-lecture series at the University of Illinois Institute of Labor and Industrial relations in 1955 and 1958.

At Cornell, she lived at the Telluride House where she was one of the first women to become a member of that renowned intellectual community. Kirstin Downey, author of The Woman Behind the New Deal: The Life of Frances Perkins, FDR's Secretary of Labor and His Moral Conscience, dubbed her time at the Telluride House "probably the happiest phase of her life".

Perkins is buried in the Glidden Cemetery in Newcastle, Maine.

Legacy

Perkins is famous for being the first woman cabinet member, as well as from her policy accomplishments. She was heavily involved with many issues associated with the social safety net including, the creation of social security, unemployment insurance in the United States, the federal minimum wage, and federal laws regulating child labor.

In 1967, the Telluride House and Cornell University's School of Industrial and Labor Relations established the Frances Perkins Memorial Fellowship. In 1982, Perkins was inducted into the National Women's Hall of Fame. In 2015, Perkins was named by Equality Forum as one of their 31 Icons of the 2015 LGBT History Month. In 2019, she was announced as among the members of the inaugural class of the Government Hall of Fame. Also that year, Elizabeth Warren used a podium built with wood salvaged from the Perkins homestead.

Character in historical context
As the first woman to become a member of the presidential cabinet, Perkins had an unenviable challenge: she had to be as capable, as fearless, as tactful, and as politically astute as the other Washington politicians, in order to make it possible for other women to be accepted into the halls of power after her.

Perkins had a cool personality that held her aloof from the crowd. On one occasion, however, she engaged in some heated name-calling with Alfred P. Sloan, the chairman of the board at General Motors. During a punishing United Auto Workers strike, she phoned Sloan in the middle of the night and called him a scoundrel and a skunk for not meeting the union's demands. She said, "You don't deserve to be counted among decent men. You'll go to hell when you die." Sloan's late-night response was one of irate indignation.

Her achievements indicate her great love of workers and lower-class groups, but her Boston upbringing held her back from mingling freely and exhibiting personal affection. She was well-suited for the high-level efforts to effect sweeping reforms, but never caught the public's eye or its affection.

Memorials and monuments
President Jimmy Carter renamed the headquarters of the U.S. Department of Labor in Washington, D.C., the Frances Perkins Building in 1980.  Perkins was honored with a postage stamp that same year. Her home in Washington, D.C. from 1937 to 1940, and her Maine family home are both designated National Historic Landmarks.

The  Frances Perkins Center  is a nonprofit organization located in Damariscotta, Maine. Its mission is to fulfill the legacy of Frances Perkins through educating visitors on her work and programs and preserving the Perkins family homestead for future generations. The Center regularly hosts events and exhibitions for the public.

Perkins remains a prominent alumna of Mount Holyoke College, whose Frances Perkins Program allows "women of non-traditional age" (i.e., age 24 or older) to complete a bachelor of arts degree. There are approximately 140 Frances Perkins scholars each year.

Maine Department of Labor mural of Perkins
A mural depicting Perkins was displayed in the Maine Department of Labor headquarters, the native state of her parents. On March 23, 2011, Maine's Republican governor, Paul LePage, ordered the mural removed. A spokesperson for the governor said he received complaints about the mural from state business officials and an "anonymous" fax charging that it was reminiscent of "communist North Korea where they use these murals to brainwash the masses". LePage also ordered that the names of seven conference rooms in the state department of labor be changed, including one named after Perkins. A lawsuit was filed in U.S. District Court seeking "to confirm the mural's current location, ensure that the artwork is adequately preserved, and ultimately to restore it to the Department of Labor's lobby in Augusta".  As of January 2013, the mural resides in the Maine State Museum, at the entrance to the Maine State Library and Maine State Archives.

Veneration
In 2022, Frances Perkins was officially added to the Episcopal Church liturgical calendar with a feast day on 13 May.

In popular culture
Perkins is a minor character in the 1977 Broadway musical Annie, in which she alongside Harold Ickes is ordered by Roosevelt to sing along to the song Tomorrow with the title character.  It is during this scene in the show that Roosevelt's cabinet comes up with the idea of the New Deal.

In the 1987 American movie Dirty Dancing, the lead character Frances "Baby" Houseman reveals that she was named after Perkins.

David Brooks's 2015 book The Road to Character includes an extensive chapter biography of Perkins.

See also
 List of female United States Cabinet members
 Silicosis

Notes

References

Bibliography
 Colman, Penny. A woman unafraid : the achievements of Frances Perkins (1993) online
 Downey, Kirstin. The Woman Behind the New Deal: The Life of Frances Perkins, FDR's Secretary of Labor and His Moral Conscience, (New York: Nan A. Talese/Doubleday, 2009). .
 Keller, Emily. Frances Perkins: First Woman Cabinet Member. (Greensboro: Morgan Reynolds Publishing, 2006). .
 Leebaert,  Derek. Unlikely Heroes: Franklin Roosevelt, His Four Lieutenants, and the World They Made  (2023); on Perkins, Ickes, Wallace and Hopkins.

 Levitt, Tom. The Courage to Meddle: the Belief of Frances Perkins. (London, KDP, 2020). .
 Martin, George Whitney. Madam Secretary: Frances Perkins. New York: Houghton Mifflin Co., 1976. . online.
 Myers, Elisabeth P. Madam Secretary: Frances Perkins (1972) online
 Pasachoff, Naomi. Frances Perkins: Champion of the New Deal. New York: Oxford University Press, 1999. .
 Pirro, Jeanine Ferris. "Reforming the urban workplace: the legacy of Frances Perkins." Fordham Urban Law Journal (1998): 1423+ online.
 Prieto, L. C., Phipps, S. T. A., Thompson, L. R. and Smith, X. A. “Schneiderman, Perkins, and the early labor movement”, Journal of Management History (2016), 22#1 pp. 50–72.
 Severn, Bill. Frances Perkins: A Member of the Cabinet. New York: Hawthorn Books, Inc., 1976. . online
 Williams, Kristin S., and Albert J. Mills. "Frances Perkins: gender, context and history in the neglect of a management theorist". Journal of Management History (2017). 23#1: 23–50. http://dx.doi.org/10.1108/JMH-09-2016-0055

Primary sources
 Perkins, Frances. The Roosevelt I Knew (Viking Press, 1947). online

External links

Frances Perkins Center
Audio recording of Perkins lecture at Cornell

Frances Perkins Collection at Mount Holyoke College 
Perkins Papers at Mount Holyoke College 
Frances Perkins Collection. Rare Book and Manuscript Library, Columbia University
Notable New Yorkers – Frances PerkinsBiography, photographs, and interviews of Frances Perkins from the Notable New Yorkers collection of the Oral History Research Office at Columbia University
Columbians Ahead of Their Time, Frances Perkins biography
Frances Perkins. Correspondence and Memorabilia. 5017. Kheel Center for Labor-Management Documentation and Archives, Martin P. Catherwood Library, Cornell University.
Frances Perkins Lectures at the Kheel Center for Labor-Management Documentation and Archives, Martin P. Catherwood Library, Cornell University.
Eleanor Roosevelt Papers Project: Frances Perkins
U.S. Department of Labor Biography
"Biographer Chronicles Perkins, 'New Deal' Pioneer", All Things Considered, March 28, 2009. An interview with Kirstin Downey about her biography of Frances Perkins.
 "Remembering Social Security's Forgotten Shepherd", Morning Edition, August 12, 2005.  Penny Colman and Linda Wertheimer Discuss Frances Perkins
Remarkable Frances Perkins in Twin Cities in 1935 – Pantagraph (Bloomington, Illinois newspaper)
 

1880 births
1965 deaths
20th-century American politicians
20th-century American women politicians
American Episcopalians
Columbia Graduate School of Arts and Sciences alumni
Cornell University School of Industrial and Labor Relations faculty
Mount Holyoke College alumni
Pittsburgh Labor History
Politicians from Boston
Politicians from Worcester, Massachusetts
Franklin D. Roosevelt administration cabinet members
State cabinet secretaries of New York (state)
Truman administration cabinet members
United States Secretaries of Labor
Women members of the Cabinet of the United States
Workers' education